The Principal Anti-Air Missile System (PAAMS) is a joint programme developed by France, Italy, and the United Kingdom for an integrated anti-aircraft warfare system. The prime contractor is EUROPAAMS, a joint venture between Eurosam (66%) and UKAMS (33%). In the United Kingdom, PAAMS has been given the designation Sea Viper.     

The system equips the s in French and Italian service as well as the British Type 45 destroyers.

Background

PAAMS was originally intended to be deployed in the 'Common New Generation Frigate' (also known as the ) for the navies of the United Kingdom, France, and Italy. The French DGA placed a contract with EUROPAAMS on 11 August 1999 for the development and initial production of the PAAMS warfare system along with the associated Long Range Radar (LRR) system. The contract included one PAAMS system and one LRR for each of the first British, French, and Italian new class of warships. Irreconcilable differences in the design requirements and workshare disagreements led to the United Kingdom leaving the 'Common New Generation Frigate' project in October 1999. After withdrawing, Britain instead decided to pursue a national warship design, designated the Type 45 destroyer. The United Kingdom remained committed to the PAAMS project. As a result of efforts to achieve economies of scale, the PAAMS command and control system shares common architecture between the Horizon class and Type 45 destroyers. In 2009, PAAMS(S) was given the service name 'Sea Viper' by the Royal Navy.

PAAMS components
PAAMS(S) — British variant with SAMPSON Multi-Function Radar (MFR)
PAAMS(E) — French/Italian variant with EMPAR Multi-Function Radar
Automatic command and control system
Consoles running Windows 2000 operating system
Sylver Vertical Launching System
Aster missiles:
Aster 15, range; 
Aster 30, range; 
Both variants of the PAAMS operate in conjunction with the S1850M Long Range Early Warning Radar.

Capabilities

PAAMS is designed to track, target and destroy a variety of high-performance air threats, including saturation attacks of very low altitude, supersonic cruise missiles, fighter aircraft, and UAVs. PAAMS can launch eight missiles in under ten seconds with its Sylver Vertical Launching System, and simultaneously guide up to 16 missiles. The PAAMS(S) variant consists of both the SAMPSON and S1850M long-range radars and is capable of tracking in excess of 1,000 targets at ranges of up to 400 km. BAE Systems also claims that its SAMPSON radar has "excellent detection of stealth aircraft and missiles". Like the later baselines of the US Aegis Combat System, the PAAMS can engage multiple targets simultaneously.

Testing
During its first major warfare sea exercise aboard , the ship's Combat Management System crashed while under simulated air attack due to a power failure, and the ship lost use of its combat management system; the ship's crew reverted to use of binoculars to spot incoming airborne threats until the CMS had been restarted.
In 2009, two test firings of PAAMS in the British configuration from the Longbow trials barge failed due to "failures in the terminal phase of the engagement." It was believed that "production weaknesses" in a batch of Aster 30 missiles imported from France were to blame.
It was the first time a European missile defence system destroyed a supersonic sea-skimming "missile". The trial was described as a "complex operational scenario".
In September 2013, HMS Daring of the Royal Navy demonstrated the ability of her Sea Viper system to detect and track at considerable range two medium-range ballistic missiles at the Ronald Reagan Ballistic Missile Defense Test Site in the Marshall Islands, US.
In May 2019,  successfully used her Sea Viper system to destroy an incoming drone target as part of Exercise Formidable Shield.
In May 2019, the French frigate Bretagne destroyed a supersonic missile flying at more than Mach 2 with one of her Aster 15s during exercise Formidable Shield.

Operators

Current operators

 
 s - two ships
 FREMM multipurpose frigates- eight ships

 
 Horizon-class frigates - two ships
 FREMM multipurpose frigates - ten ships

 
 Type 45 destroyers - six ships

See also
Anti-aircraft warfare

References

External links
Navy Matters on PAAMS
UK's Parliamentary Defence Select Committee: Session 2001/02 Update on weapons programmes.
UK's Parliamentary Defence Select Committee: Session 2002/03 Update on Type 45, PAAMS, and other surface ships.

21st-century surface-to-air missiles
Naval surface-to-air missiles
Naval weapons of the United Kingdom